Graptocorixa abdominalis is a species of water boatman in the family Corixidae. It is found in Central America and North America.

References

Further reading

 
 
 
 
 
 
 

Graptocorixini
Hemiptera of Central America
Hemiptera of North America
Insects described in 1832
Taxa named by Thomas Say